A kantharos  or cantharus  is a type of ancient Greek cup used for drinking. Although almost all surviving examples are in Greek pottery, the shape, like many Greek vessel types, probably originates in metalwork. The Greek words kotylos (κότῦλος, masculine) and kotyle (κοτύλη, feminine) are other ancient names for this same shape.

The kantharos is a cup used to hold wine, possibly for drinking or for ritual use or offerings. The kantharos seems to be an attribute of Dionysos, the god of wine, who was associated with vegetation and fertility. 

As well as a banqueting cup, they could be used in pagan rituals as a symbol of rebirth or resurrection, the immortality offered by wine, "removing in moments of ecstasy the burden of self-consciousness and elevating man to the rank of deity."

Gallery

See also
 Kylix
 Rhyton
 Ancient Greek vase painting
 Pottery of ancient Greece

Notes

References

Ancient Greek pot shapes